van Heugten is a Dutch surname. Notable people with the surname include:

Antoinette van Heugten, American author of the 2010 novel Saving Max
Marijn van Heugten, Dutch footballer
Ton van Heugten (1945–2008), Dutch sidecarcross rider

Surnames of Dutch origin